In 1989, the United States Army Pacific had its headquarters at Fort Shafter in Hawaii, and its units were stationed within the United States. Overseas forces included the US Army Japan, and the Eighth US Army in South Korea.

I Corps

6th Infantry Division 

6th Infantry Division (Light), Fort Richardson, Alaska
 Headquarters & Headquarters Company
 1st Brigade, Fort Richardson, Alaska
 Headquarters & Headquarters Company
 1st Battalion, 17th Infantry
 2nd Battalion, 17th Infantry (reflagged 1st Battalion, 501st Infantry (Airborne) on 16 October 1989)
 2nd Brigade, Fort Wainwright, Alaska
 Headquarters & Headquarters Company
 4th Battalion, 9th Infantry
 5th Battalion, 9th Infantry
 6th Battalion, 297th Infantry (Alaska Army National Guard assigned 1 September 1989)
 205th Infantry Brigade (Light), Fort Snelling, Minnesota (Army Reserve)
 Headquarters and Headquarters Company
 3rd Battalion, 3rd Infantry, Saint Paul, Minnesota
 1st Battalion, 409th Infantry, St. Cloud, Minnesota
 1st Battalion, 410th Infantry, Iowa City, Iowa
 3rd Battalion, 14th Field Artillery, Sioux City, Iowa (18 × M101 105mm towed howitzer)
 Support Battalion
 Cavalry Troop
 Engineer Company
 Aviation Brigade, Fort Wainwright
 Headquarters & Headquarters Company
 4th Squadron, 9th Cavalry (Reconnaissance)
 2nd Battalion, 123rd Aviation (Attack), Saint Paul, Minnesota (Army Reserve)
 4th Battalion, 123rd Aviation (Combat Support)
 Division Artillery, Fort Richardson, Alaska
 Headquarters & Headquarters Battery
 4th Battalion, 11th Field Artillery, Fort Richardson (18 × M101 105mm towed howitzer)
 5th Battalion, 11th Field Artillery, Fort Wainwright (18 × M101 105mm towed howitzer)
 Battery G, 11th Field Artillery, Mankato, Minnesota (8 × M198 155mm towed howitzer)
 6th Division Support Command
 Headquarters & Headquarters Company
 6th Medical Battalion
 6th Supply & Transportation Battalion, Fort Wainwright
 706th Maintenance Battalion, Fort Richardson
 431st Aviation Intermediate Maintenance Company, Saint Paul, Minnesota (Army Reserve)
 1st Battalion, 188th Air Defense Artillery, Grand Forks, North Dakota (North Dakota Army National Guard)
 6th Engineer Battalion, Fort Wainwright
 6th Signal Battalion, Fort Richardson
 106th Military Intelligence Battalion, Fort Richardson
 Military Police Company
 Chemical Company
 6th Division Band

7th Infantry Division 

 7th Infantry Division (Light), Fort Ord, California
 Headquarters & Headquarters Company
 1st Brigade
 1st Battalion, 9th Infantry Regiment
 2nd Battalion, 9th Infantry Regiment
 3rd Battalion, 9th Infantry Regiment
 2nd Brigade
 5th Battalion, 21st Infantry Regiment
 2nd Battalion, 27th Infantry Regiment
 3rd Battalion, 27th Infantry Regiment
 3rd Brigade
 3rd Battalion, 17th Infantry Regiment
 4th Battalion, 17th Infantry Regiment
 4th Battalion, 21st Infantry Regiment
 Aviation Brigade
 Headquarters & Headquarters Company
 1st Squadron, 9th Cavalry (Reconnaissance)
 1st Battalion, 123rd Aviation (Attack)
 3rd Battalion, 123rd Aviation (Combat Support)
 Division Artillery
 Headquarters & Headquarters Battery
 2nd Battalion, 8th Field Artillery (18 × M119 105mm towed howitzer)
 6th Battalion, 8th Field Artillery (18 × M119 105mm towed howitzer)
 5th Battalion, 15th Field Artillery (18 x M198 155mm towed howitzer, attached I Corps Artillery unit)
 7th Battalion, 15th Field Artillery (18 × M119 105mm towed howitzer)
 Battery B, 15th Field Artillery (8 × M198 155mm towed howitzer)
 Division Support Command
 Headquarters & Headquarters Company
 7th Medical Battalion
 7th Supply & Transportation Battalion
 707th Maintenance Battalion
 Company D, 123rd Aviation (Maintenance, redesignated Company E, 123rd Aviation on 16 October 1988)
 2nd Battalion, 62nd Air Defense Artillery
 13th Engineer Battalion
 127th Signal Battalion
 107th Military Intelligence Battalion
 7th Military Police Company
 761st Chemical Company
 7th Division Band

25th Infantry Division 

 25th Infantry Division (Light), Schofield Barracks, Hawaii
 Headquarters & Headquarters Company

 1st Brigade
 1st Battalion, 14th Infantry Regiment
 1st Battalion, 27th Infantry Regiment
 4th Battalion, 27th Infantry Regiment

 2nd Brigade
 5th Battalion, 14th Infantry Regiment
 1st Battalion, 21st Infantry Regiment
 3rd Battalion, 21st Infantry Regiment

 3rd Brigade 
 3rd Battalion, 22nd Infantry Regiment
 4th Battalion, 22nd Infantry Regiment
 4th Battalion, 87th Infantry Regiment

 25th Combat Aviation Brigade
 3rd Squadron, 4th Cavalry Regiment
 1st Battalion, 25th Aviation Regiment
 4th Battalion, 25th Aviation Regiment
 F Company, 25th Aviation Regiment

 25th Division Artillery

 3rd Battalion, 7th Field Artillery Regiment (18 × M101 105mm towed howitzer)
 7th Battalion, 8th Field Artillery Regiment (18 × M101 105mm towed howitzer)
 2nd Battalion, 11th Field Artillery Regiment (18 × M101 105mm towed howitzer)
 1st Battalion, 8th Field Artillery Regiment (8 × M198 155mm towed howitzer)

 25th Division Support Command

 65th Engineer Battalion
 1st Battalion, 62nd Air Defense Artillery Regiment
 125th Military Intelligence Battalion
 125th Signal Battalion
 25th Military Company
 25th Forward Support Battalion
 225th Forward Support Battalion
 325th Forward Support Battalion
 725th Main Support Battalion

US Army Japan 

 IX US Corps Headquarters - Camp Zama

Eighth United States Army 

  Eight Army, Yongsan Garrison, South Korea
 Headquarters & Headquarters Company
  2nd Infantry Division, Camp Casey 
  17th Aviation Brigade, Camp Coiner
 Headquarters & Headquarters Company
 4th Battalion, 58th Aviation (Air Traffic Control), Camp Coiner
 1st Battalion, 501st Aviation (Assault), Camp Coiner (UH-60A Black Hawk helicopters)
 2nd Battalion, 501st Aviation (Medium Lift), Camp Coiner (CH-47D Chinook helicopters)
 4th Battalion, 501st Aviation (Attack), Camp Page (AH-1F Cobra & OH-58C Kiowa helicopters)
 5th Battalion, 501st Aviation (Attack), Camp Coiner (AH-1F Cobra & OH-58C Kiowa helicopters)
  1st Signal Brigade, Camp Humphreys
 Headquarters & Headquarters Company
 36th Signal Battalion
 41st Signal Battalion
 304th Signal Battalion, Camp Colbern
 307th Signal Battalion
 257th Signal Company, Camp Humphreys
  8th Military Police Brigade (Provisional), Camp Coiner
 Headquarters & Headquarters Company
 94th Military Police Battalion
 728th Military Police Battalion
  501st Military Intelligence Brigade (Provisional), Yongsan Garrison
 Headquarters & Headquarters Detachment
 3rd Military Intelligence Battalion (Aerial Exploitation), Camp Humphreys
 524th Military Intelligence Battalion (Human Intelligence)
 532nd Military Intelligence Battalion (Intelligence & Electronic Warfare)
 751st Military Intelligence Battalion (Counterintelligence), Camp Humphreys
  18th Medical Command, Seoul (the following peacetime listing is incomplete)
 Headquarters and Headquarters Detachment
 52nd Medical Battalion
 121st Combat Support Hospital, Camp Humphreys
  19th Support Command, Daegu (the following peacetime listing is incomplete)
 Headquarters and Headquarters Company
 Special Troops Battalion
 20th Area Support Group, Camp Henry
 Headquarters and Headquarters Company
 23rd Area Support Group, Camp Humphreys
 Headquarters and Headquarters Company
 194th Maintenance Battalion
 227th Maintenance Battalion
 Company A, 3rd Battalion 501st Aviation (Aviation Intermediate Maintenance), Camp Humphreys
 Company A, 3rd Battalion, 501st Aviation (Aviation Intermediate Maintenance), Camp Humphreys
 25th Transportation Center (Movement Control), Yongsan Garrison
 21st Transportation Company (Command Transport), Yongsan Garrison
 46th Transportation Company, Camp Carroll
 34th Area Support Group, Seoul
 Headquarters and Headquarters Company
 501st Corps Support Group, Camp Red Cloud
 Headquarters and Headquarters Company
 8th Personnel Command
 516th Personnel Service Company
 175th Finance Center
 176th Finance Support Unit
 177th Finance Support Unit
 23rd Chemical Battalion
 44th Engineer Battalion (Combat) (Heavy), Camp Mercer
 8th Army Band

References

Structures of military commands and formations in 1989
Commands of the United States Army